The Badi or Badhi are a Hindu caste found in the state of Uttar Pradesh, India. They have scheduled caste status.

Origin

The Badi are sub-group within the larger Nat caste. They are found mainly in Saharanpur District. The Badi are further divided into a number of clans, the main ones being the Swaroop and Aurender. They are strictly endogamous and practice clan exogamy.

Present circumstances

The Badi are one of a number of nomadic communities that were involved in entertaining at fairs. A fair number are now employed as agricultural labourers, with a smaller number have acquired small plots of land.

The 2011 Census of India for Uttar Pradesh showed the Badi population as 11,028.

References

Scheduled Castes of Uttar Pradesh